Microeulima is a genus of small sea snails, marine gastropod mollusks in the family Eulimidae.

Species
 Microeulima bartschi (Strong & Hertlein, 1937)
 Microeulima hemphillii (Dall, 1884)
 Microeulima terebralis (Carpenter, 1857)
Species brought into synonymy
 Microeulima proca (de Folin, 1867): synonym of Microeulima terebralis (Carpenter, 1857)
 Microeulima violacea (Carpenter, 1857): synonym of Microeulima terebralis (Carpenter, 1857)

References

External links
 To World Register of Marine Species

Eulimidae